The 2021 ESPY Awards were the 29th annual ceremony of the ESPY Award, held on July 10, 2021 at The Rooftop at Pier 17 in New York City and broadcast on  ABC. Actor Anthony Mackie served as the host. The awards aired on ESPN and ESPN2 on July 11, and a two-hour version aired on ESPN July 13.

Format
After the COVID-19 pandemic made the 2020 ESPYs a virtual taped event, it was a live in-person show with many of the winners showing up to accept their awards.  The ESPYs brought back many of the categories from 2019; however, Best Upset, Best Esports Moment and Best Viral Moment were not awarded.

Several categories were renamed and/or changed in scope:
 Best Male Athlete and Best Female Athlete are now Best Athlete, Men's Sports and Best Athlete, Women's Sports, respectively.
 The Best Male and Female College Athlete awards, last presented in 2017, were reinstated and respectively renamed Best College Athlete, Men's Sports and Best College Athlete, Women's Sports.
 The Best International Soccer Player awards for men and women, previously presented to soccer players who were either born outside the U.S. or were not U.S. citizens, were renamed Best International Athlete, Men's Soccer and Best International Athlete, Women's Soccer. In addition, these awards are now presented to individuals who play at club level in leagues outside of the U.S. soccer pyramid, regardless of the players' nationalities.

Winners and nominees 

Note: Best Play and Best WWE Moment were in an elimination format with 16 entrants at the beginning.

Note: Best MLB Player voting was halted, mainly due to allegations of sexual assault by Trevor Bauer.

Non-competitive awards

Jimmy V Award: Chris Nikic, triathlon

Arthur Ashe Courage Award: Maya Moore
     
Pat Tillman Award for Service: Marcus Rashford, Manchester United and England national football team

Best Coach: Tara VanDerveer, Stanford Cardinal women's basketball head coach

Best Championship Moment: Los Angeles Dodgers win 2020 World Series

Best Championship Performance: Simone Biles - gymnastics

References

External links
 ESPN: Serving sports fans. Anytime. Anywhere. – ESPN

2021
ESPY
ESPY
ESPY
ESPY
ESPY Awards